CNI may refer to:

Businesses and organizations

Government and politics
 National Intelligence Centre (Mexico) (Spanish: Centro Nacional de Inteligencia, National Intelligence Centre), the Mexican national intelligence agency
 National Intelligence Centre (Spain) (Spanish: Centro Nacional de Inteligencia, National Intelligence Centre), the Spanish national intelligence agency
 Central Nacional de Informaciones (Spanish, 'National Information Center'), the Chilean national intelligence agency
 Centre national des indépendants et paysans (French, 'National Centre of Independents and Peasants', CNIP or CNI), a French political party
 Council for the National Interest, an American political advocacy organization 
 Commission on National Integration, now National Commission on Indigenous Peoples (Philippines)
 Coordinadora Nacional de Independientes, (Spanish, 'National Coordinator of Independents'), a Peruvian political party
 Comunità Nazionale Italiana (Italian, 'Italian National Community'), an organisation representing Dalmatian Italians in Croatia and Montenegro 
 Campaign for National Independence, Maltese political group of former prime minister Karmenu Mifsud Bonnici
 Congreso Nacional Indígena, (Spanish, 'National Indigenous Congress), a Mexican organization

Media and communications
 Coalition for Networked Information, an American non-profit organization 
Corporación de Noticias e Información (Spanish, 'News and Information Corporation'), Mexican TV channel, now XHTVM-TV
 Cult Network Italia, an Italian TV channel, now Sky Cinema Cult
 Community Newspapers Inc., the name of several companies 
 Christian Network, Inc., owner of The Worship Network TV channel

Other organizations
 Center for the National Interest
 Church of North India
 Corpo della Nobiltà Italiana (Italian, 'Body of the Italian Nobility'), the Italian nobility association
 CNI College, or Career Networks Institute, in Santa Ana, California, U.S.
 Cherokee Nation Industries, owned by Cherokee Nation Businesses

Science and technology

Computing
 Common-network interface ring in Alcatel-Lucent products
 Compiled native interface (previously Cygnus native interface), software framework for the GNU Compiler for Java
 Container Network Interface, a Linux Foundation project

Medicine
 Calcineurin inhibitor, an Immunosuppressive drug
 CN I, or Olfactory nerve, the first cranial nerve

Other uses
 Colegio Nacional Iquitos, a Peruvian soccer team
 Critical national infrastructure, or Critical infrastructure, assets essential for the functioning of a society and economy
 CNI, IATA code for Changhai Airport in Liaoning province, China
 CNI, U.S. FAA code for Cherokee County Regional Airport, Georgia, U.S.
 CNI Music, 1990 record label of Paolo Dossena

See also